Butler County is a county located in the U.S. state of Iowa. As of the 2020 census, the population was 14,334. Its county seat is Allison. The county was organized in 1854 and named for General William O. Butler.

History
Butler County was formed on January 15, 1851, from open land. It was named after Kentucky native William Orlando Butler, a general and hero of the Mexican–American War, who ran as Vice President of the United States in 1848. Until 1854, the county was governed by other counties.  Only at this time did it have enough inhabitants to establish its own local government. The first court proceedings were conducted in a small log cabin of a settler.  In 1858, the first courthouse was completed in Clarksville.  After it was sold shortly thereafter to the local school district, it was used as a schoolhouse from 1863 until 1903.

Clarksville was the first county seat, from 1854 to 1860, after which Butler Center became the seat. Because locals became disenchanted with Butler Center (partially because of its inaccessibility during the winter), Allison was made the county seat on January 10, 1881, after the tracks of the Dubuque and Dakota Railroad had been laid there.

Butler County is the only county in Iowa that does not have any stop lights, four-lane roads (US Highway or interstate), a hospital, or a movie theatre. There are also no national fast-food chains in Butler county.

Geography

Major highways
 Iowa Highway 3
 Iowa Highway 14
 Iowa Highway 57
 Iowa Highway 188

Adjacent counties

Floyd County (north)
Bremer County (east)
Black Hawk County (southeast)
Grundy County (south)
Franklin County (west)
Chickasaw County (northeast)
Cerro Gordo County (northwest)
Hardin County (southwest)

Demographics

2020 census
There were 6,536 housing units of which 5,992 were occupied.

2010 census
There were 6,682 housing units, of which 6,120 were occupied.

2000 census

As of the census of 2000, there were 15,305 people, 6,175 households, and 4,470 families residing in the county.  The population density was 26 people per square mile (10/km2).  There were 6,578 housing units at an average density of 11 per square mile (4/km2).  The racial makeup of the county was 98.95% White, 0.08% Black or African American, 0.05% Native American, 0.20% Asian, 0.02% Pacific Islander, 0.16% from other races, and 0.53% from two or more races.  0.58% of the population were Hispanic or Latino of any race.

There were 6,175 households, out of which 30.90% had children under the age of 18 living with them, 62.80% were married couples living together, 6.30% had a female householder with no husband present, and 27.60% were non-families. 25.00% of all households were made up of individuals, and 14.50% had someone living alone who was 65 years of age or older.  The average household size was 2.43 and the average family size was 2.90.

In the county, the population was spread out, with 24.40% under the age of 18, 6.40% from 18 to 24, 24.90% from 25 to 44, 24.20% from 45 to 64, and 20.10% who were 65 years of age or older.  The median age was 41 years. For every 100 females, there were 96.20 males.  For every 100 females age 18 and over, there were 93.70 males.

The median income for a household in the county was $35,883, and the median income for a family was $42,209. Males had a median income of $30,356 versus $20,864 for females. The per capita income for the county was $17,036.  About 6.50% of families and 8.00% of the population were below the poverty line, including 9.80% of those under age 18 and 9.40% of those age 65 or over.

Communities

Cities

Allison
Aplington
Aredale
Bristow
Clarksville
Dumont
Greene
New Hartford
Parkersburg
Shell Rock

Unincorporated communities
Austinville
Kesley
Packard

Townships
Butler County is divided into sixteen townships:

 Albion
 Beaver
 Bennezette
 Butler
 Coldwater
 Dayton
 Fremont
 Jackson
 Jefferson
 Madison
 Monroe
 Pittsford
 Ripley
 Shell Rock
 Washington
 West Point

Population ranking
The population ranking of the following table is based on the 2020 census of Butler County.

† county seat

Politics

See also

National Register of Historic Places listings in Butler County, Iowa

References

External links

Butler County Tribune-Journal

 

 
1851 establishments in Iowa
Populated places established in 1851